Inconel Alloy 625 (UNS designation N06625) is a nickel-based superalloy that possesses high strength properties and resistance to elevated temperatures. It also demonstrates remarkable protection against corrosion and oxidation. Its ability to withstand high stress and a wide range of temperatures, both in and out of water, as well as being able to resist corrosion while being exposed to highly acidic environments makes it a fitting choice for nuclear and marine applications.

Inconel 625 was developed in the 1960s with the purpose of creating a material that could be used for steam-line piping.  Some modifications were made to its original composition that have enabled it to be even more creep-resistant and weldable. Because of this, the uses of Inconel 625 have expanded into a wide range of industries such as the chemical processing industry, and for marine and nuclear applications to make pumps and valves and other high pressure equipment.

Because of the metal's high Niobium (Nb) levels as well as its exposure to harsh environments and high temperatures, there was concern about the weldability of Inconel 625. Studies were therefore conducted to test the metal's weldability, tensile strength and creep resistance, and Inconel 625 was found to be an ideal choice for welding. Other well known names for Inconel 625 are Haynes 625, Nickelvac 625, Nicrofer 6020,  Altemp 625 and Chronic 625

Chemistry
Inconel 625 was designed as a solid solution strengthened material with no significant microstructure. This holds true at low and high temperatures, but there is a region (923 to 1148 K) where precipitates form that are detrimental to the creep properties, and thus the strength, of the alloy. Under any creep conditions (high temperature with an applied stress), M23C6-type carbides form at the grain boundaries. When tested at 973 K, γ” precipitates begin forming. These γ” phase precipitates are ordered A3 B type with a composition of Ni3(Nb, Al, Ti) and a tetragonal crystal structure. They form a disk-shaped morphology and are coherent with respect to the matrix. When tested at 998 K, a δ-phase precipitate begins forming which consist of Ni3(Nb, Mo) in an orthorhombic crystal structure. They form in a needle-like morphology and are incoherent with the matrix. Both of these precipitates can be completely dissolved back into the matrix when the sample is heated to 1148 K for 5 hours. This leads to the ability to recover creep properties of the alloy to prolong the materials lifetime.

ASTM Specifications 
ASTM (American Society for Testing and Materials) for various products made out of Inconel 625 are as follow:

Markets
Markets for Inconel 625 include:
 Offshore
 Marine
 Nuclear
 Chemical Processing
 Aerospace
Glow Plugs

Applications
Product and technology applications of Inconel 625 include:
 Seawater components
 Flare stacks
 Aircraft ducting systems
 Fabrication with Inconel 625
 Specialized seawater equipment
 Chemical process equipment
 Turbine shroud rings
 Engine thrust-reverser systems
 Jet engine exhausts systems
 Boiler furnaces

Specifications
Specifications and certifications include:
 AMS: 5599, 5666
 MS: 5837
 ASME: SB 443 Gr 1, SB 446 Gr 1
 ASTM: B 443 Gr 1, B 446 Gr 1
 EN: 2.4856
 ISO: 15156-3
 NACE: MR0175-3
 UNS: N06625
 Werkstoff: 2.4856

See also
 Inconel
 Incoloy
 Monel
 Hastelloy
 Nimonic

References

Superalloys